Ford developed the MEL ("Mercury-Edsel-Lincoln") engine series as the replacement for the Lincoln Y-block V8 engine for use in large passenger car applications. These engines were produced in Lima, Ohio at Ford's Lima Engine plant. They were in turn replaced by the 385 series engines.

All MEL engines had wedge-shaped combustion chambers formed between a flat head surface and an angle milled block deck (10 degrees off square with the bore axis), with the piston top determining the compression ratio and combustion chamber shape, similar to the Chevrolet Big-Block 348 combustion chamber, also introduced in 1958, and the later 409 and 427. Unlike the Chevrolet, which had staggered valves and scalloped or M shaped valve covers, the MEL valves were inline with shaft mounted rocker arms like the FE model Ford engines which were introduced at the same time. As with the previous generation V8s, an open runner intake manifold was used, requiring the use of a stamped steel lifter valley cover similar to that of the Pontiac V8 engines. Also, the intake manifold provided no exhaust crossover passage to warm the air-fuel mixture. Further MEL engines employed two individual thermostats, aimed to improve the regulation of the engine's coolant temperature. It was introduced the same year Chrysler phased out the Hemi V8 for the Chrysler B engine which was also a wedge-shaped combustion chamber.

The MEL bore some mechanical similarities with the Ford FE, utilizing similar components such as the oiling system, bolt patterns, and valve stems; however, the MEL was a Lincoln-specific engine and was even larger in displacement capacity. The connecting rod beam had a unique triangular shape with the shoulders for the bolts sitting low toward the cap mating surface . There was one major difference between the MEL and FE engines besides their size and weight; the valves on MEL engines were arranged in alternating fashion (I-E-I-E-I-E-I-E) and not in the manner of the FE (E-I-E-I-I-E-I-E) where the I indicates an intake valve and the E indicates an exhaust valve.

The MEL was one of three new engine families introduced by Lincoln and Ford in 1958. The others were the FE (Ford Edsel) and SD (super duty), the latter being large and extra powerful, slow-revving engines engineered for heavy-duty work trucks. The FE engine saw its use in the Edsel, a model which was introduced to the vehicle lineup by Ford, described as a car which blended design features of the Ford and Mercury lines combining them with its own individual styling. Further several new Lincoln vehicles, such as the Continental luxury sedan and coupe, as well as the all-new four-seat Thunderbird of the same year, which were brought to market utilizing the new engines.

383

The  Marauder was the smallest member of the family. Produced from 1958 through 1960, it was only used in Mercury vehicles. It used a  bore and stroke.

410

The MEL  engine was the only engine offered in the 1958 Edsel Citation and Corsair models. Bore and stroke were 4.20 and 3.70 inches respectively. It was not an option on the Pacer, Ranger or station wagon models, which exclusively used the FE 361 engine. 

There were no other Ford Motor Company applications for this engine such as in Ford and Mercury cars and Ford Trucks. The MEL engine range also included 383 (exclusive to Mercury), 430 (Thunderbird, Mercury, Lincoln, Continental, and Lincoln Continental) and a  engine that was exclusive to Lincoln Continentals. In 1965, Ford produced a 410 version of the FE engine that was exclusive to Mercury. Other than displacement, there is no relation between the two engines.

430

The  engine was produced from 1958 through 1965. It was the standard engine on all 1958 to 1960 Lincolns and Continentals. It was an optional engine on all Mercurys from 1958 to 1960 but Mercury models had a little less horsepower than the Lincolns and Continentals. The 430 was also an optional engine in 1959 and 1960 Ford Thunderbirds. It was commonly referred to as the Thunderbird 430 Special. The 1958 Super Marauder version used 3 two-barrel carburetors to generate , the first American production car to reach this figure. It was an option on all 430 equipped 1958 Mercurys and all 1958 Lincolns and Continentals. This engine featured the tripower intake manifold, which was cast for Ford by Moon products. Three Holley 2300 carburetors were used. The 430 had a 4.30   bore (same as the 383) and shared the  stroke of the 410.

Some 1958 Continental Mark IIIs came brand new with the Holley 4150 four-barrel carburetor.

The 430 engine in particular had a limited but storied history in hot-rodding. The first Miami to Nassau race won by Bertram Yachts (which subsequently helped establish their name) featured a boat powered by twin 430 MEL engines. In the 1959 NASCAR season, Holman Moody campaigned a number of Thunderbirds, at least some of which were powered by 430s. At least one car survives. The cars were ponderous handlers because of the heavy engine, but successful runners. The Holman Moody 430 Thunderbirds caught the attention of Ford after one of them, driven by Johnny Beauchamp, finished a close second to Lee Petty at the 1959 Daytona 500.
Houston's Rodney Singer and crew chief Karol Miller used a GMC supercharged Lincoln-powered dragster to win the 1959 NHRA Nationals Top Eliminator. Theirs was the first supercharged TE in NHRA history, starting a string which has continued through the present.

Because of the changing nature of heads, intakes and piston designs, as well as a limited life span, not many aftermarket speed parts were made for the MEL line of engines. Edelbrock made a 6X2 intake manifold and a set of water-cooled marine exhaust manifolds (M4) and Weiand made a Drag Star 8X2 manifold as well. Other speed parts have been rumored, but they are difficult to find.

462

The 430 was replaced by the  engine in 1966. This engine was fitted with hydraulic lifters and a four-barrel Carter AFB carburetor. This large torquey engine was used only in Lincoln Continentals, from 1966 until mid-year in 1968 when it was replaced by the 385-series 460. Production ended after 1968. The production facilities in Lima were converted to produce the new Ford 385 engine family.

Applications

 1958: all Edsel Citation and Corsair models as standard equipment (410 only)
 1958–1960: all Continental models Marks III, IV, V as standard equipment (430 only)
 1958–1960: all Lincoln models as standard equipment (430 only)
 1958–1960: all Mercury models as standard or optional equipment (383 and 430 only)
 1959–1960: all Ford Thunderbird models as optional equipment (430 only)
 1961–1965: all Lincoln Continental models as standard equipment (430 only)
 1966–1968: all Lincoln Continental models as standard equipment (462 only)

See also

 List of Ford engines

References

MEL
V8 engines
Gasoline engines by model